Hook's Tavern or Hook Tavern was a late 18th-century tavern along the Northwestern Turnpike (U.S. Route 50) east of Capon Bridge in Hampshire County, West Virginia. It was listed on the National Register of Historic Places on April 29, 2011. It burned in an alleged arson on October 14, 2022.

History
Located near the eastern base of Bear Garden Mountain in the Mill Branch valley, Hook's Tavern was constructed along the Northwestern Turnpike between the 1790 and 1809 on property belonging to early Hampshire County settler Peter Mauzy.

In 1840, the property was purchased by the Hook family who began operating the building as a tavern. Samuel Hook and John B. Sherrard obtained a hotel license on May 26, 1848, to operate the tavern as a fully functioning hotel. On June 1, 1862, Hook paid $10 for another hotel keeper's license.

During the American Civil War, on February 3, 1862, J. A. Hunter of the Confederate States Army stated that because of severe weather, it was necessary for the Confederates to commandeer Samuel Hook's tavern and wood for the comfort of 80 sick men in his charge.

Renovations in July 1956 revealed the name and date "William C. Black, May 7, 1845" on a plaster wall. Other names and remarks discovered included: "I can throw any mule driver on the road, John New" and "Too much snuff, McCauley" dated May 7, 1853.

The Hook family and its descendants owned the tavern and its surrounding property from 1840 until 1987 when it was purchased by real estate developer Edward Noble of Atlanta, Georgia. In 2009, the tavern and its adjacent three acres were listed on the market for sale. The property became a junk store owned by Judson Eversole, of Eversole Enterprises. Hook's Tavern burned down in the early morning hours of October 14, 2022.

Architecture
Hook's Tavern was an ell-shaped structure with one leg parallel to U.S. Route 50 and the other parallel to Smokey Hollow Road (County Route 6). Hook's Tavern was a clapboard-covered, two-story structure with floors on three varying heights indicating that it was built in several phases. The tavern's front face along U.S. Route 50 was graced with a two-story porch. Its oldest constructed section contained a large fireplace with printles upon which a crane swung pots over the fire. Hook Tavern contained approximately  consisting of ten rooms and two bathrooms.

Image gallery

See also 
List of historic sites in Hampshire County, West Virginia
National Register of Historic Places listings in Hampshire County, West Virginia

References

External links

Drinking establishments on the National Register of Historic Places in West Virginia
Hampshire County, West Virginia, in the American Civil War
Hotel buildings on the National Register of Historic Places in West Virginia
Houses in Hampshire County, West Virginia
Houses on the National Register of Historic Places in West Virginia
I-house architecture in West Virginia
National Register of Historic Places in Hampshire County, West Virginia
Northwestern Turnpike
Capon Bridge, West Virginia
Log buildings and structures on the National Register of Historic Places in West Virginia
American Civil War sites in West Virginia